Ta-Dah is the second studio album by American alternative band Scissor Sisters, released on September 15, 2006. It was produced by the band and includes collaborations with Elton John, Carlos Alomar, and Paul Williams. The album debuted at number 19 on the US Billboard 200 chart, selling 42,000 copies in its first week. Upon its release, Ta-Dah received positive reviews from most music critics.

Release and promotion 
The album's release in the United Kingdom, on September 18, 2006, was preceded by the release of the single, "I Don't Feel Like Dancin'". The song reached number one on both the UK Singles and Download charts in September 2006.

"Land of a Thousand Words" was released as the second single from the album, peaking at number 19 in the UK. "She's My Man" was the third single released in early March 2007 and managed to chart at number 29. The next single that was released was "Kiss You Off" on May 28. This was the poorest charting of the singles of Ta-Dah, only being able to reach number 43. This has, so far, been the lowest charting UK single on initial release. "I Can't Decide" charted at number 64 on downloads alone, on the strength of being used in the Doctor Who episode "Last of the Time Lords".

Reception 
  
The album entered the Irish Albums Chart at number one on September 21, followed three days later by a number one entry in the UK Albums Chart. In the United States, it debuted at number 19 on the Billboard 200, with first-week sales of 42,000 copies. As of May 2010 it has sold 181,000 copies in United States.

Ta-Dah received positive reviews from most music critics. At Metacritic, which assigns a normalized rating out of 100 to reviews from mainstream critics, the album received an average score of 71, based on 30 reviews, which indicates "generally favorable reviews".

NME gave the album a score of six out of ten and said, "Scissor Sisters sound under so much pressure to follow up a monster hit that they're not actually having any fun." Similarly, Paste gave it a score of six out of ten and said that the songs "tend to dull the excitement."  Tiny Mix Tapes gave it three-and-a-half out of five stars and said, "So what if Scissor Sisters aren't challenging the conventions of pop music?... [Ta-Dah is] great and will please their fans." musicOMH gave it four out of five stars and said, "There's a darker lyrical side to the album at once incongruous and ingenious when placed in such celebratory music."

However, some reviews varied from mixed to negative.  PopMatters gave the album five stars out of ten and said, "Despite its title, Ta-Dah offers few surprises."  Now gave it two stars out of five and said, "Somehow, Ta-Dah feels like the Sisters covering themselves, and the glitter and gloss have worn off."  In his Consumer Guide, Robert Christgau gave it a "dud" rating, indicating that it was "a bad record whose details rarely merit further thought."

Track listing

 The UK edition of the album has a pregap, consisting of two minutes of silence after "Everybody Wants the Same Thing". Subsequently, what seems to be the sound of an elevator reaching its destination floor is heard as an 8-second interlude at the end of the pregap. "Transistor" then begins.

Deluxe edition bonus disc
"Hair Baby" (Hoffman/Sellards/Gruen/Alomar) – 4:06
"Contact High (Demo)" (Hoffman/Sellards/Lynch) – 3:37
"Almost Sorry" (Hoffman/Sellards/Williams) – 3:15
"Transistor" (Hoffman/Sellards) – 4:51
"Making Ladies" (Hoffman/Sellards) – 4:39
"I Don't Feel Like Dancin' (Paper Faces Remix)" (Hoffman/Sellards/John) – 6:34

Personnel
 Jake Shears – vocals
 Babydaddy – bass guitar, keyboards, vocals, guitar
 Ana Matronic – vocals
 Del Marquis – guitar, bass guitar
 Paddy Boom – drums, percussion
 Elton John – piano on "I Don't Feel Like Dancin'" and "Intermission"
 J.J. Garden – additional piano on "She's My Man", piano on "I Can't Decide", "Land of a Thousand Words", "The Other Side" and "Everybody Wants the Same Thing"
 Gina Gershon – Jew's harp on "I Can't Decide"
 Carlos Alomar – additional guitar and bass on "Lights", "Paul McCartney" and "Hair Baby", additional guitar on "Transistor"
 Paul Leschen – piano on "Lights", "Ooh" and "Everybody Wants the Same Thing"
 Crispin Cioe – saxophone and horn arrangement on "Lights", "Paul McCartney" and "The Other Side"
 Bob Funk – trombone on "Lights", "Paul McCartney" and "The Other Side"
 Larry Etkin – trumpet on "Lights", "Paul McCartney", "The Other Side"
 Joan Wasser – string arrangement and violin on "Land of a Thousand Words"
 Jeff Hill – cello on "Land of a Thousand Words"
 Van Dyke Parks – string arrangement on "Intermission"
 Peter Kent – concert master on "Intermission"

Charts

Weekly charts

Year-end charts

Certifications and sales

Release history

References

External links
 Ta-Dah at Discogs

2006 albums
Scissor Sisters albums
Polydor Records albums
Universal Motown Records albums